In public transport, a short turn, short working or turn-back is an earlier terminus on a bus or rail line that is used on some scheduled trips that do not operate along the full length of the route.

Short turns are practical in scheduling when the short-turning bus can proceed through its layover at the short turn loop, then start a run in the opposite direction, all while reducing the number of buses needed to operate all trips along the route as opposed to if all scheduled trips operated to the terminus of full-length trips.

Short turns require the availability of a separate loop on the bus or rail line where the vehicle can turn around and lay over. On bus routes, this could be streets that can accommodate bus traffic. On a rail line, this means a location where the layover does not interfere with other rail traffic.

On rail lines, short turns are more limited due to the number of crossovers between tracks.

Purposes

Demand for services
Short turns are used on bus routes and rail lines where there is a lower demand for service along the part of the route not served by the short-turning trips. This helps in reducing operating costs. While more economical, these short turns do not necessarily reduce the number of buses needed to operate the full amount of service along the route.

An alternative to this are services that split up into multiple branches. This provides a frequent service on the main route while the individual branches are served less frequently.

Crowd management
Short turns can aid in reducing overcrowding of buses. By scheduling uneven intervals between full-length and short turn trips, this may lead to accommodation of more riders on the trips coming out of the short turn layover location.

Short turns can be used to reduce bus bunching.

References

Transportation planning
Scheduling (transportation)